The Rescue is a 1929 American Pre-Code romantic adventure film directed by Herbert Brenon, and produced by Samuel Goldwyn. The screenplay was written by Elizabeth Meehan, based on the 1920 novel by Joseph Conrad. The music score is by Hugo Riesenfeld. The film stars Ronald Colman and Lili Damita.

Cast
Ronald Colman as  Tom Lingard 
Lili Damita as Lady Edith Travers 
Alfred Hickman as  Mr. Travers 
Theodore von Eltz as  Carter 
John Davidson as  Hassim 
Philip Strange as  D'Alacer 
Bernard Siegel as  Jorgensen 
Sōjin Kamiyama as  Daman 
Harry Cording as  Belarab 
Laska Winter as  Immada 
Duke Kahanamoku as  Jaffir 
Louis Morrison as  Shaw 
George Regas as  Wasub 
Chrispin Martin as  Tenga

Preservation status
An incomplete print, missing one reel, is in the collection of the George Eastman House film archive.

See also
The Rescue novel by Joseph Conrad

References

External links

 
 
The Rescue at SilentEra

American black-and-white films
1929 films
Films directed by Herbert Brenon
1929 adventure films
1929 romantic drama films
Samuel Goldwyn Productions films
Films based on works by Joseph Conrad
Seafaring films
American romantic drama films
1920s American films